All for One is the debut album by Australian hard rock band The Screaming Jets which was released in April 1991. It peaked at No. 2 on the ARIA Charts.

The album was re-recorded in 2021 and released in October 2021 as All for One (30 Year Anniversary Edition), which debuted at number 4 on the ARIA Charts.

Background
The Screaming Jets are a hard rock group that formed in January 1989 in Newcastle with singer Dave Gleeson, drummer Brad Heaney, guitarist Richard Lara, guitarist Grant Walmsley and bass guitarist Paul Woseen. Their first performance was at a Newcastle pub in March. The band won the inaugural National Band Competition run by youth radio broadcaster Triple J in November. They relocated to Sydney by early 1990 and supported The Angels on a national tour. In May, they signed with independent label, rooArt. Their debut extended play (EP), The Scorching Adventures of the Screaming Jets, was issued in December.

In April 1991, The Screaming Jets released their debut studio album All for One which peaked at No. 2 on the Australian Recording Industry Association (ARIA) Albums Chart. It was produced by Steve James and released by rooArt in Australia, Germany and United States as a CD, cassette and LP album. The US release has an alternative cover. It reached the Top 50 on the ARIA End of Year Albums Chart for 1991.

The album's lead single, "Better", peaked at number 4 on the ARIA Singles Chart. Two top 40 singles, "Stop the World" and "Shine On" followed. The controversial track "F.R.C." ("Fat Rich Cunts") was a crowd favourite and released in USA and Canada. Gleeson would dedicate the song to Michael Gudinski or Russ Hinze at concerts. At times, "F.R.C." was performed by guest vocalists from Mortal Sin, The Choirboys or The Angels.

Following the album's release, the group relocated to the United Kingdom where they based themselves for over two years. They toured there, the rest of Europe and the US as they supported varied hard rock and heavy metal bands. .

Reception

According to Australian rock music historian, Ian McFarlane, All for One "was a cogent and energetic release, one of the strongest debuts from an Australian hard rock band. Reference points for the album's gritty rock'n'roll included the flash of early Van Halen mixed with the traditional thunder of AC/DC and The Angels".

Track listing

Charts and certifications

Weekly charts

Year-end charts

Certifications

Release details

Personnel
The Screaming Jets members
Dave Gleeson – vocals
Richard Lara – guitar, backing vocals
Grant Walmsley – guitar, backing vocals
Paul Woseen – bass guitar, backing vocals
Brad Heaney – drums

Recording details
Engineer – David Price
Mastering – Don Bartley
Mixing – David Hemming, Steve James
Producer – Steve James
Studios – Paradise Studios (production), Rhino Studios (mixing), Studios 301 (mastering). Sydney, Australia

References

General

  Note: Archived [on-line] copy has limited functionality.
 
Specific

External links
 

The Screaming Jets albums
1991 debut albums